Speozuphium poulteri is a species of beetle in the family Carabidae, the only species in the genus Speozuphium.

References

Dryptinae